Kil'ayim (or Klayim) (lit. "mixture," or "diverse kinds") are the prohibitions in Jewish law which proscribe the planting of certain mixtures of seeds, grafting, the mixing of plants in vineyards, the crossbreeding of animals, the formation of a team in which different kinds of animals work together, and the mixing of wool with linen in garments. 

Prohibitions
The Torah lists several different examples of mixtures that are prohibited as mixed species. 
The halakha classifies the prohibitions under the following categories: 
 interbreeding of animals of different species 
 planting mixed seeds
 grafting of different species of trees 
 shatnez - mixing wool and linen in garments 
 planting grain or seed-crop in a vineyard
 ploughing or doing other work with two different species of animal.

Permitted and forbidden instances

In fabrics
Torah law forbids the wearing of Kil'ayim (shatnez) – sheep wool and linen fabrics that have been hackled together, or spun and woven together. Likewise, "intertying" sheep wool and linen together is forbidden, the two exceptions being garments of kohanim worn in the Temple and tzitzit. Concerning tzitzit, the Sages of Israel permit using wool and linen strings in tandem only when genuine blue dye tchelet is available, whereas kabbalist sources go a step further by encouraging this practice. The Torah forbids only wool and linen to be worn together. Camel's wool, Cashmere wool, Yak fiber, and the like of such fibres, are not prohibited to be worn with linen.

According to Maimonides, if a Jew had purchased an all-woolen product from a gentile and wanted to ascertain whether or not it was, indeed, pure wool – without the admixture of flax-linen, its fabric could be tested by dyeing. A dye-solution applied to the fabric would reveal whether or not it was of pure wool, as wool and linen products do not retain the same shades in a dye solution.

In plantings
Two or more diverse seed-crops must be distanced enough so as to be distinguished from each other as two separate plantings. The laws governing diverse seed-plantings or vegetables apply only to crops grown in the Land of Israel, but do not apply to seed-crops or vegetables planted outside the Land of Israel. The prohibition not only applies to sowing together diverse kinds, but also hoeing the ground wherein diverse kinds were sown together, as well as covering them over in top soil, whether by one's foot, or by hand, or by any implement. The same prohibition applies to when they were sown together in a flower pot that was perforated at the bottom.
  
According to biblical exegete Nachmanides, the reason for its prohibition being that when seedlings draw nutrients from other seedlings, their properties and natural forms are changed thereby and the sower cancels thereby the fixed design and purpose of the universe.

Diverse seed-plantings or vegetables that grew together in violation of the biblical command are permitted to be eaten, although the crop itself must be uprooted. If two diverse grain seeds (e.g. wheat and barley) were inadvertently mixed together, they must be separated before they can be sown. If, however, there were 24 parts more of one grain than the other (ratio of 24 to 1), the lesser grain is considered cancelled by the other, and may still be sown together. If there were not 24 parts more than the mixed grain, the whole must be sorted.

Specific permitted and forbidden species
The first chapter of Mishnah Kil'ayim permits the growing together of certain plants, although the members of each pair belong to two different kinds. An example of which are certain species of Graminae, or the grass family. Wheat and tares belong to different genera (Triticum and Lolium, respectively), but they resemble each other in both their seeds and their leaves. Tares are often found growing in wheat fields. Its seeds may germinate even several years after having been planted, so that its growth could not always be prevented. This argument has been used to explain why it was not prohibited to have wheat and tares growing together in the same field. 

The rabbinic treatise develops the principle that a planter should not only be concerned with the mixing together of different classes of items (a thing generally forbidden), but also with the appearance of such intermixing, such that if the two kinds are similar in appearance, although of different genera, this can, at times, be tolerated.   

The Mishnah in tractate Kil'ayim (1:1) explicitly permits faba beans (Vicia faba) and mung beans (Vigna radiata; Vigna mungo) to be planted together, as they are considered homogeneous. It also permits the planting of white mustard (Sinapis alba) and of Egyptian mustard (Brassica nigra)  together (Kil'ayim 1:2), as they, too, are considered to be homogeneous, despite being two different genera. However, white mustard (Sinapis alba) and charlock mustard, also known as wild mustard (Sinapis arvensis), though also similar in appearance, may not be planted together (ibid. 1:5), as they are considered heterogeneous. J. Feliks maintained that while the two vegetables are similar in respect to both their leaves, yellow flowers, and taste, they are considered diverse-kinds because of a difference in their roots. Accordingly, the plant's roots become the ultimate criterion for determination of diverse kinds. 

Cucumbers and muskmelons, although two different species, are not considered "diverse kinds" with respect to each other and may be planted together. Rabbi Yehudah, disputing, says that they are considered "diverse kinds" with respect to each other and cannot be planted together.

Although two different species, the Mishnah (Kil'ayim 1:3) permits planting together turnips (Brassica rapa subsp. rapa) with rape (Brassica napus subsp. napus). Likewise, cauliflower (Brassica oleracea botrytis) and kohlrabi (Brassica var. caulorapa), although different species, are permitted to be planted together. Maimonides, in his commentary on the same Mishnah, explained the word karūb  as having the Judeo-Arabic connotation of כרנב, meaning either cabbage (Brassica oleracea var. capitata) or kale (Brassica oleracea var. acephala).

Conversely, radish (Raphanus raphanistrum) and rape cannot be planted together (Kil'ayim. 1:5). Jonah maintains that while the two vegetables are similar in
respect to both their leaves and their fruits, they are considered diverse-kinds because of a difference in taste. Neither can the Egyptian gourd (Cultivar of Cucumis melo) be planted together with the Grecian gourd (Lagenaria vulgaris), as they too are heterogeneous.

Grafting of trees

The prohibition of grafting of trees is treated on in the Mishnah (Kil'ayim 1:4). Among trees, while it is permissible to grow two different kinds of trees in close proximity to each other, it is forbidden for an Israelite (or a gentile working on behalf of an Israelite) to graft the branch (scion) of one tree onto the stump of another tree to produce thereby a hybrid fruit if the trees are not one and the same kind. Quinces (Cydonia oblonga) are named as an exception, for if a branch taken from it were grafted onto a stump belonging to hawthorns (Crataegus azarolus), although they are two different species, it is permitted unto Israel to benefit therefrom, since they are considered related. Likewise, to graft the branch of Krustemelin (said to be the "Calaprice pears") onto the rootstock of an ordinary pear (Pyrus communis) is permitted. However, apple trees (Malus domestica) grafted onto medlars (Mespilus germanica), or peach trees (Prunus persica) grafted onto almond trees (Prunus dulcis), or jujubes (Ziziphus jujuba) grafted onto Christ's thorn jujubes (Ziziphus spina-christi), although similar in appearance, are "diverse kinds."  The fruit produced by grafting the bud of one dissimilar tree onto the rootstock of the other are permitted to be consumed by Israel, although the trees themselves, according to some authorities, are not permitted to be maintained.

The Chazon-Ish, who was uncertain about the identity of the trees mentioned in the Mishnah owing to conflicting opinions, made it a rule to be stringent in all of them, prohibiting their grafting in all cases. A Jew who transgressed by grafting two dissimilar trees was, formerly, liable to flogging. The prohibition of grafting two dissimilar trees applies to trees in the Land of Israel, as well as to trees outside the land of Israel; whether trees belonging to a Jew or to a gentile.

Vineyards
The Sages of Israel have described the prohibition of growing diverse kinds in a vineyard, strictly from a biblical perspective, as referring only to two grain varieties (such as wheat and barley), or either to hemp and arum, or similar plants which reach maturity with the grain. By a rabbinic prohibition, however, it is not permitted to plant or maintain a vineyard while the vineyard shares the same immediate ground with any vegetable or seed-crop grown for food (e.g. mustard seeds, chickpeas, etc.). The result of doing so would be to cause its owner to forfeit the seed-crop together with the increase of the vineyard thereof.  Therefore, the rabbis made it incumbent upon husbandmen and vine-dressers to distance their seed-crop from a vineyard. According to Maimonides, if a trellised vine of at least five plantings was made alongside a fence or a wall, even if the stumps of the grape-vines were distant from the wall one cubit, the planter of seed  is only permitted to sow seed 4 cubits beyond the wall or fence, since the grape-vine is prone to spread itself as far as the wall, and there must always be at least 4 cubits from a vineyard and the seed-crop. Certain plants that grow of themselves in a vineyard, such as lianas (Cissus spp.), bindweed (Convolvulus spp.), sweet clover (Melilotus), the anemone (Anemone coronaria), are not accounted as "diverse kinds" in a vineyard, to cause its owner to forfeit the crop of the vineyard altogether. 

If, however, either wild marjoram (Origanum syriacum), or whorled savory (Satureja thymbra), or dyer's croton (Chrozophora tinctoria), white-leaved savory (Micromeria fruticosa), or mallows (Malva sylvestris), Grape hyacinth (Muscari commutatum), or saffron (Crocus spp), Egyptian cucumber (Cucumis melo var. chate), gourds, muskmelons, or beetroot (Beta vulgaris) were left to grow in a vineyard in the Land of Israel, any of these kinds would render the entire vineyard prohibited. The common denominator between these plants is that, in the Land of Israel during Mishnaic times, if they were seen growing in places other than in a vineyard, their owners would have been interested in their upkeep and maintenance, due to some benefit derived from these plants, such as when they are used as animal fodder, or for human consumption, or for medicinal purposes. Their presence in a vineyard, if they are allowed to grow unmolested shows willful negligence in what concerns this prohibitory law of Diverse kinds. The same rule applies to other plants not specifically named in the Tosefta (Kil'ayim 3:12), but which plants may have special and common usage among the people of a certain place where he has made his residence, and which plants grow in his vineyard, even outside the Land of Israel. 

If thorn bushes, such as camelthorn (Alhagi maurorum) (Hebrew: ההגין), and box-thorn (Lycium shawii) (Hebrew: אטדין), grew within a vineyard, they are not accounted as a seed-crop and may be sustained in a vineyard, the rabbis giving to them the classification of trees amongst trees. However, in places where thorn bushes are used as fodder for camels and the owner of the vineyard is content to have the thorn bushes grow in his vineyard to that end, the thorn bushes, if maintained, would render the entire vineyard forbidden.

By a rabbinic injunction, the prohibition of growing diverse seed-crops in a vineyard extends to vineyards vintaged by Jews outside the Land of Israel. In reference to the mixed seed planted in a vineyard, the law is only transgressed when wheat, barley, and grape seed are sown simultaneously in that vineyard. The reason for this prohibition, according to Maimonides, is to avoid imitating the custom of the people in olden days who would sow barley and stones of grape together, in the belief that the vineyard could only prosper in this way. The planter transgresses the biblical command from the moment grain begins to take root within a vineyard, and the grapes have reached the size of white peas (Vigna unguiculata).

By a rabbinic decree, other seed-crops are forbidden to be planted in a vineyard. Had a person transgressed and grew a seed-crop within his vineyard, not only is the produce forbidden to be eaten, but also had he sold the produce, the proceeds accruing from the sale of such produce are also forbidden, and must be burnt, together with the vineyard. The practical bearing of this rabbinic edict is in respect of someone who came along and maliciously sowed Diverse seedlings in his neighbor's vineyard where there is beginning to grow nascent fruit. In such a case, the rabbinic authority has made the seed crop prohibited (requiring its burning), but the vineyard and its fruit are still permitted. The reason for this leniency is because most seedlings sown in a vineyard are only a rabbinic prohibition, and the rabbis did not punish the owner of the vineyard in the case of another person's malfeasance. However, wherever the non-seed plants of hemp and arum were planted in a vineyard, seeing that their planting in a vineyard stands in direct violation of the Torah itself, such plantings would render the entire vineyard prohibited, requiring its burning.

In animals
In modern classification of animals, the genus Canis is used to include dogs, wolves, coyotes, and jackals. Even so, the mating of dogs and wolves is forbidden. Similarly, the mating of a horse and mule (even though they cannot reproduce) is forbidden.

Though a Jew is forbidden to crossbreed a horse and a donkey (producing a hinny or mule), had a gentile bred them, it is permitted for a Jew to make use of them.

References

Notes

Bibliography


, Hil. Kil'ayim (p. 390)
, s.v. Hil. Kil'ayim (vol. 4)

Land of Israel laws in Judaism
Negative Mitzvoth
Jewish agrarian laws
Hebrew words and phrases in the Hebrew Bible
Hebrew words and phrases in Jewish law